Gary Porter may refer to:

 Gary Porter (driver), American monster-truck driver
 Gary Porter (footballer) (born 1966), English footballer
 Gary Porter (American football), American football player
 Gary Porter (rugby union) (born 1996), South African rugby union player
 Gary Porter, Baron Porter of Spalding, British politician